Molla Hasan may refer to:
 Molla Hasan, North Khorasan
 Molla Hasan, West Azerbaijan

See also
 Molla Hasani (disambiguation)